The WAFU U20 Women's Cup is a women's association football competition contested by national teams of  All West African Football Union.

The first edition will be  played in 2022 with eleven teams. It was planned for November 2021 but it was then postponed four months.

Tournament history

Participating nations
Legend

 – Champions
 – Runners-up
 – Third place
 – Fourth place
 – Losing semi-finals
QF – Quarter-finals
GS – Group stage

Q — Qualified for upcoming tournament
 – Did not qualify
 – Withdrew
 – Hosts

References

West African Football Union competitions